Qia or QIA may refer to:

Qia
He Qia (died after 228), a high-ranking Chinese official during the Three Kingdoms period
Xi Qia (1883–1950), a general of the Kirin Provincial Army of the Republic of China

QIA
Quality Improvement Agency, in the United Kingdom
Qatar Investment Authority
A stock ticker symbol for Qiagen, a biotechnology company